Crestmoor High School opened in San Bruno, California in September 1962 to relieve congestion at Capuchino High School and Mills High School.  It was the seventh high school to be built by the San Mateo Union High School District, based in San Mateo, California.  Construction began in 1960 on a graded plateau in the Crestmoor district of San Bruno and took about two years to complete.  The buildings, which are similar in design to those of Aragon High School, Hillsdale High School, and Mills High School, were constructed mostly of steel and glass, featuring expansion systems to provide earthquake resistance. The school, and its similarly designed schools, have been designed in an architectural style described as "postwar techno-optimism". The school was closed in 1980.

Field Area:The schools Baseball and Football/Track fields are still open to the public, and are currently maintained by the San Bruno City.  The track is one of the last dirt tracks you can run on.  The fields are enjoyed by youth soccer teams.

The view from the school site takes in the East Bay and South San Francisco to San Mateo.

Closing

Declining student enrollment in the San Mateo Union High School District prompted the school board to consider closing a school in the fall of 1980. The final choice came down to Burlingame High School or Crestmoor.  In the vote, the board decided to close Crestmoor despite Crestmoor's having a larger enrollment than Burlingame and being a newer facility with lower operating and maintenance costs than several district schools. The 1,500-student facility was closed in 1980, relieving the school district of construction debt. Some of the buildings were later used for a continuation high school, Peninsula High School (San Bruno).

The San Mateo Union High School District board decided that sale of the campus would help alleviate a major financial shortfall. The proposed sale of the campus was opposed by San Bruno residents. , the facility continues to house San Mateo Union High School District's continuation/alternative high school, Peninsula Alternative High School.

Culminating a yearslong process, San Mateo Union High School District officials agreed to sell the former Crestmoor High School campus in San Bruno to D.R. Horton for as much as $125 million.

Notable alumni
 Paul Cayard, Class of 1977. Americas Cup Skipper. Elected to the Sailing World Hall of Fame 2002

Faculty
 John Christgau, Basketball coach

References

Further reading

High schools in San Mateo County, California
Educational institutions established in 1962
Defunct schools in California
Educational institutions disestablished in 1980
San Bruno, California
1962 establishments in California